Otha Peters Jr. (born February 27, 1994) is an American football linebacker who is a free agent. He played college football for Louisiana-Lafayette.

College career
Peters attended Louisiana-Lafayette after transferring from the University of Arkansas where he was a 2012 SEC All-Freshman team selection. After sitting out the 2014 season following the transfer, Peters earned 2015 Honorable Mention All-Sun Belt recognition and 2016 First-team All-Sun Belt honors for the Ragin' Cajuns.

Professional career

Seattle Seahawks
Peters signed with the Seattle Seahawks as an undrafted free agent on May 12, 2017. He was waived by the team on September 2, 2017.

Washington Redskins
On November 13, 2017, Peters was signed to the Washington Redskins' practice squad. He was promoted on the active roster on December 12. He was waived on April 13, 2018.

Kansas City Chiefs
On August 1, 2018, Peters signed with the Kansas City Chiefs. He was waived on September 1, 2018.

Winnipeg Blue Bombers 
On January 6, 2020, Peters signed with the Winnipeg Blue Bombers. He was released on July 19, 2021.

References

External links 
 Official website
 Washington Redskins bio
 ULL Ragin' Cajuns bio

1994 births
Living people
Sportspeople from Louisiana
People from St. Tammany Parish, Louisiana
American football linebackers
Louisiana Ragin' Cajuns football players
Seattle Seahawks players
Washington Redskins players
Kansas City Chiefs players
Winnipeg Blue Bombers players